Félix Martin-Feuillée (25 November 1830 – 5 August 1898) was a French politician of the French Third Republic. He was born in Rennes, France. He graduated from the University of Rennes in 1854. He was a member of the Chamber of Deputies of France from 1876 to 1889. He was deputy secretary of the ministry of the interior and cult (4 March – 28 December 1879) in the government of William Henry Waddington. He was deputy secretary of the ministry of justice (29 December 1879 – 30 January 1882) in the governments of Léon Gambetta and Jules Ferry. He was minister of justice (21 February 1883 – 6 April 1885).

References

Sources

External links
 Notice Biographique de Félix Martin-Feuillée sur Gallica

1830 births
1898 deaths
Politicians from Rennes
Republican Union (France) politicians
French Ministers of Justice
Members of the 1st Chamber of Deputies of the French Third Republic
Members of the 2nd Chamber of Deputies of the French Third Republic
Members of the 3rd Chamber of Deputies of the French Third Republic
Members of the 4th Chamber of Deputies of the French Third Republic
University of Rennes alumni